HMP Fosse Way is a Category C prison currently under construction in Leicester, England, UK. It will be operated by Serco.

History 
The prison is being constructed on the site of HM Prison Glen Parva which closed in 2017.

In August 2022, a proposal to increase the size of the prison to accommodate 250 additional inmates was announced. On 15 December 2022, the proposal was approved.

References 

Prisons in Leicestershire